These are the songs that reached number one on the Top 50 Best Sellers chart in 1956 as published by Cash Box magazine.

See also
1956 in music
List of number-one singles of 1956 (U.S.)

References
http://www.cashboxmagazine.com/archives/50s_files/1956.html

1956
1956 record charts
1956 in American music